The Congressional Leadership Fund (CLF) is a Super PAC dedicated to electing Republicans to the U.S. House of Representatives. The Super PAC, which was closely linked to former House Speaker John Boehner and House GOP leadership, was founded in 2011 and spent nearly $10 million in the 2012 cycle electing Republican candidates. Following Boehner's resignation from the U.S. Congress and the election of Paul D. Ryan as Speaker of the House, Congressional Leadership Fund became closely linked to Ryan.

In The Guardian's ranking of the five most bigoted campaign ads during the 2018 election campaign, four of the five were ads by the CLF. During the 2018 mid-term elections. CLF produced a number of false ads, including two that falsely linked two Democratic candidates with terrorists. In one ad, the CLF depicted Antonio Delgado, an African-American Rhodes scholar with a Harvard Law degree, as a foul-mouthed and "disturbingly radical" rapper, and misrepresented lyrics from his rap career.

Leadership
 Former Minnesota senator Norm Coleman, chairman emeritus 
 Fred Malek, chairman
 Former representative Thomas M. Reynolds, board member
 Former representative Vin Weber, board member
 Charlie Spies, senior adviser (former)
 Mason Fink, board member and finance director
 Daniel Conston, executive director
 William Inman, deputy executive director
 Patrick Lee, national field director
 Ruth Guerra, communications director
 Trent Edwards, development director (former)
 Caleb Crosby, treasurer

 the Congressional Leadership Fund does not list its leadership on its official website.

The board members are all members of the board of the American Action Network. The Super PAC is currently headed by Daniel Conston, who serves as executive director to both CLF and the linked American Action Network.

Fundraising and spending

2012 
According to records from the Federal Elections Commission, during the 2012 election cycle, CLF raised $11.3 million and spent $10.8 million. Of the 19 congressional races where CLF and the affiliated American Action Network paid for television ads, Republicans won 12 of the contests. The non-partisan Sunlight Foundation reported that CLF had a 58.05% return on investment in 2012.

Their largest donor was Sheldon Adelson, who gave $5 million in 2012. Other major donors included the late Texas home builder Bob J. Perry and Chevron.

2014 
According to records from the Federal Election Commission, during the 2014 election cycle, CLF raised $12.6 million and spent $12.56 million.

2016 
According to records from the Federal Elections Commission, during the 2016 election cycle, CLF raised just over $51.05 million and spent $50.05 million.

During the 2016 election, CLF used stolen hacked material in attacks ads against a Democratic candidate.

2018 
In 2018, the CLF was described as "the highest-spending super PAC seeking to sway House races in the upcoming midterms." CLF was the largest Republican outside spender in the special election to fill Montana's at-large seat vacated by then Rep. Ryan Zinke after he was appointed to serve as Secretary of Interior by President Donald Trump. CLF invested $2.5 million in Montana to promote Greg Gianforte to the U.S. House of Representatives. Rep.-elect Gianforte was charged with assaulting a journalist at a rally on May 24, 2017, on the eve of the special election. Three of the state's largest newspapers, the Billings Gazette, the Missoulian and the (Helena) Independent Record, rescinded their endorsements of Gianforte shortly following the incident. Rep.-elect Gianforte was scheduled to appear in court before June 7, where he was required to answer an accusation that he "purposely or knowingly" caused "bodily injury to another". Rep. Elect Gianforte won slightly more than 50 percent of the vote to about 44 percent for Mr. Quist, the Democrat. President Trump won Montana by about 20 percentage points. On June 12, 2017, Gianforte pleaded guilty to misdemeanor assault and was sentenced to a 180-day deferred sentence, 40 hours of community service, 20 hours of anger management and a $300 fine along with an $85 court fee.

According to records from the Federal Elections Commission, as of June 6, 2017, Congressional Leadership Fund had made independent expenditures totaling just over $2.94 million in the Georgia 6th Congressional District Special Election against Democrat Jon Ossoff. CLF pledged $6.5 million to the special election in an attempt to keep the seat in control of the GOP after former HHS Secretary Tom Price vacated the seat when he was nominated by President Donald Trump to head the Department of Health and Human Services. CLF repeatedly made the claim that San Francisco "Bay Area liberals have given more to Jon Ossoff's campaign than people in Georgia," a statement that has been rated false by the fact-checking website PolitiFact. A simple search through the Federal Elections Commission verifies PolitiFact's reporting.

The super PAC also made headlines in 2017 after it released its first ad against Democrat Jon Ossoff, with an ad featuring college video footage of Ossoff dressed up as Han Solo of Star Wars. The ad was the first significant spending from any outside GOP group.

In August 2018, Democratic candidate Abigail Spanberger accused CLF of being illicitly in possession of an unredacted federal security clearance application, which contains sensitive personal information, and that CLF had provided a copy of the sensitive information to at least one news outlet.

In The Guardians ranking of the five most bigoted ads during the 2018 election campaign, four of the five were ads by the CLF. During the 2018 mid-term elections. CLF produced a number of false ads, including two that falsely linked two Democratic candidates with terrorists. In one ad, the CLF depicted Antonio Delgado, an African-American Rhodes scholar with a Harvard Law degree as a foul-mouthed and "disturbingly radical" rapper, and misrepresented lyrics from his rap career. CLF obtained the unredacted security clearance application of Abigail Spanberger, a former CIA officer and Democratic congressional candidate, and then used it for political purposes. CLF also sent the highly sensitive document to at least one media outlet. CLF then ran ads trying to link Spanberger to terrorist activity. Both Delgado and Spanberger went on to defeat incumbent Republicans for their respective House seats on November 6, 2018.

In the 2018 election cycle, the Congressional Leadership Fund raised $158 million and disbursed $159 million. Sheldon and Miriam Adelson gave $55 million of that.

References

External links

CLF Ballotpedia entry

527 organizations